Poutníci is a Czech bluegrass ensemble, heavily influential in the second wave of the genre.

The group formed in 1970; its lead singer and bassist Jiri Pola has been with the group since 1981. In 1989 and 1990, the group was awarded the Best Non-American Bluegrass Record of the Year by the American Organization for the Preservation and Development of Bluegrass Music. They have toured throughout Europe repeatedly. In addition to original compositions, they cover songs by American artists such as Lester Flatt, Bill Monroe, Tennessee Ernie Ford, and Gordon Lightfoot.

Members
František Linhárek (1970–1991)
Josef Šulák (1970–1973)
Miroslav Kocman (1970–1976)
Robert Křesťan (1979–1991)
Pavel Petržela (1979-1987)
Jiří Pola - vocals, bass (1981–present)
Zdeněk Kalina - guitar, vocals (1972–present)
Miroslav Hulan - guitar
Honza Máca - mandolin, fiddle
Petr Brandejs - banjo

Discography
Poutníci, 1987
Wayfaring Strangers, 1989
Chromí koně, 1990
The Days Of Auld Lang Syne, 1991
Poutníci Live, 1991
Je to v nás, 1992
Písně brněnských kovbojů, 1994
Co už je pryč, 1997
Krajní meze, 1998
Vzpomínky, 1999
Pláč a smích, 2003
Poutníci 2006, 2006

References
[ Allmusic entry]

External links
Official website

Czech bluegrass music groups